is a railway station located in Kitakyūshū, Fukuoka.

Lines 

Chikuhō Electric Railroad
Chikuhō Electric Railroad Line

Platforms

Adjacent stations

Surrounding area
 Comfort Hotel Kurosaki
 Tsutsui Elementary School
 Mitsubishi Kurosaki Office
 Yahatanishi Police Station
 Kumanishi Post Office
 Japan National Route 3
 Japan National Route 200

Railway stations in Fukuoka Prefecture
Railway stations in Japan opened in 1992